The Iljig Formation is a Lower Cretaceous geologic formation in South Korea. Dinosaur remains are among the fossils that have been recovered from the formation, although none have yet been referred to a specific genus.

See also

 List of dinosaur-bearing rock formations
 List of stratigraphic units with indeterminate dinosaur fossils

Footnotes

Bibliography 
  

Lower Cretaceous Series of Asia
Albian Stage